Gymnothorax taiwanensis (Taiwanese moray eel) is a moray eel found in coral reefs in the northwest Pacific Ocean around Taiwan. It was first named by Chen, Loh and Shao in 2008.

References

taiwanensis
Taxa named by Chen Hong-Ming
Taxa named by Loh Kar-Hoe
Taxa named by Shao Kwang-Tsao
Fish described in 2008